Anjana Bisankhe (Nepali: अंजना बीसङ्खे) is a Nepalese Politician and serving as the Member Of House Of Representatives (Nepal) elected from kathmandu 10 , Province bagamati . She is also member of the Presidium of Nepal Communist Party.

References

Living people
21st-century Nepalese women politicians
21st-century Nepalese politicians
Place of birth missing (living people)
Communist Party of Nepal (Maoist Centre) politicians
Nepal MPs 2017–2022
1974 births